Cathal mac Conchobar mac Taidg (died 1010) was king of Connacht.

Family tree

     'Cathal mac Conchobar mac Taidg, d. 1010.
     |
     |__
     |                   |                            |          |             |                       |
     |                   |                            |          |             |                       |
     Dub Chablaigh       Tadg in Eich Gil, d. 1030.   Brian,     Conchobor,    In Cléirech, fl. 1044.  Tadhg Direach
    =Brian Boru         =?                           d. 1029      fl. 1029.    |                       |
     |                   |                                                     |_              |
     |                   |                                                     |        |              An Gilla Lónach
     Domnall?            Áed in Gai Bernaig,                                   |        |
     |                     King of Connacht,                                    Tadg,    Conchobar,
     |                        died 1067.                                       d.1056.    d. 1069.
     Diarmait,
     d. 1051.

References

 Leabhar na nGenealach, Dublin, pp. 484–85, p. 614-15, 2004–2005
 Annals of the Four Masters, ed. John O'Donovan, Dublin, 1856
 Annals of Lough Ce, ed. W.M. Hennessey, London, 1871.
 Irish Kings and High Kings, Francis John Byrne, 3rd revised edition, Dublin: Four Courts Press, 2001. 
 "Ua Ruairc", in Seán Duffy (ed.), Medieval Ireland: An Encyclopedia''. Routledge. 2005. pp.

1010 deaths
Kings of Connacht
People from County Roscommon
People from County Galway
11th-century Irish monarchs
O'Conor dynasty
10th-century kings of Connacht
Year of birth unknown